The Sonyea Group is a geologic group in the northern part of the Appalachian Basin. It preserves fossils dating back to the Devonian period.

In the western part, it is divided into the Cashaqua Shale at the top, and the Middlesex Shale at the bottom. In the east, various shale formations are included between the Cashaqua and Middlesex members, including Rye Point Shale, Rock Stream Formation ("Enfield Formation") Siltstone, Pulteney shale, Sawmill Creek Shale, Johns Creek Shale and Montour Shale.

See also

 List of fossiliferous stratigraphic units in Pennsylvania
 Paleontology in Pennsylvania

References

 
 

Geologic groups of Pennsylvania
Devonian geology of New York (state)